Beyza (also Romanized as Beyzā, Bayḍā, Beyẕā, and Bayzâ; also known as  Tall-e Beyẕā, Tal-e Baiza, Tol-e Beyẕā, and  Sepīdān) is a city and capital of Beyza County, Fars Province, Iran.  At the 2006 census, its population was 3,593, in 845 families.

Etymology 
Beyza's ancient name was Nesayak or Nesa. Linguists derive this name from the Parthian word Ns'yk  meaning "bright, shining." Arabs during their invasion of Iran translated this name in Arabic Bayḍā which also means "bright and white." The ancient Elamite city of Anshan is sometimes believed to have been situated there. Legend attributes its foundation to Gushtasb.

Notable people 
The famous scholar Al-Baydawi is from Beyza, from where he gets his demonym.

References

Cities in Fars Province
Populated places in Beyza County